Woody Shaw with the Tone Jansa Quartet is an album led by trumpeter Woody Shaw and the Tone Janša Quartet which was recorded in the Netherlands in 1985 and released on the Timeless label.

Reception

Steve Loewy of Allmusic stated, "Shaw recorded a series of outstanding hard bop albums with American musicians but there is less available of him performing with Europeans. This album is, therefore, a welcome addition to his discography... The results are strikingly enjoyable, and all in all this should please admirers of the trumpeter".

Track listing 
All compositions by Tone Janša
 "Midi" - 5:55
 "Boland" - 5:52
 "Call Mobility" - 7:40
 "River" - 8:19
 "Folk Song" - 4:48
 "May" - 8:18

Personnel 
Woody Shaw - trumpet, flugelhorn
Tone Janša - tenor saxophone, soprano saxophone, flute
Renato Chicco - piano 
Peter Herbert - bass
Dragan Gajić - drums

References 

Woody Shaw albums
1985 albums
Timeless Records albums